Dr Iftekhar Ahmed Chowdhury is a former Caretaker government advisor in charge of Foreign Affairs (2007-2009).

Education
Chowdhury had studied at the St Gregory’s High School and Notre Dame college in Dhaka, obtaining High First Division in Matriculation and Intermediate of Arts public examinations. He obtained a MA and PhD, both in International Relations, at the Australian National University in Canberra, having stood First in First Class in Political Science Honours at the University of Dhaka.

Career
In Bangladesh’s pre-independence period, he had stood first in then-East Pakistan in the Superior Civil service examination, and joined the Civil Service of Pakistan (CSP) in 1969. He received his training in the Civil Service Academy in Lahore and began his administrative career as an Assistant Commissioner (probationer) in Abbottabad, in the North- West Frontiers of Pakistan (today’s Khaybar Pakhtunkhwa).

Chowdhury’s diplomatic career took him to Bonn, Doha, Geneva, and New York. During his longtime postings as Ambassador to the World Trade Organization (WTO) and to the United Nations (UN), he had been Chairman of the WTO Council on Trade Policy Review, WTO Committee on Trade and Development, President of the Conference on Disarmament, Chairman of the Committee for Social Development and Chairman of the UN Information Committee, Chairman of the Population and Development Commission, and Chairman of the Committee on Social Development.

Upon secondment to the United Nations in 2000, Chowdhury was appointed Special Advisor to the Secretary General of the UN Conference on Trade and Development (UNCTAD) at its headquarters in Geneva. In that capacity he assisted Secretary General Rubens Ricupero in organizing the Third UN Conference on Least Developed Countries that took place in Brussels that year. He was appointed the Chairman of the UN Second (Economic Committee) in 2003. He had been associated with the UN Reforms process as a ‘’facilitator” appointed by the President of the UN General Assembly. He was also responsible for conducting negotiations on the paragraphs on principles of the Responsibility to Protect in the ‘’Outcome Document” on UN Reforms approved by global leaders in 2005.  

When, following a political crisis in Bangladesh, a Caretaker Government was formed in January 2007, Iftekhar Chowdhury was sworn in as the Foreign Foreign in the Fakhruddin Ahmed cabinet. He was also put in charge of two additional Ministries, Overseas Employment and Chittagong Hill Tracts Affairs. 

In November 2008, there was a flare -up with Myanmar in the Bay of Bengal. A cabinet committee, helmed by Chowdhury, took a strong decision to send a naval patrol of four warships, forcing Myanmar to withdraw two of its vessels from disputed waters, ending a four-day stand off that almost brought the two neighbours into a serious armed conflict. He flew to Myanmar shortly thereafter to discuss the row. 

Following the change of government in 2009, Chowdhury took to a career in the academia. He joined the Institute of South Asian Studies (ISAS) at the National University of Singapore (NUS) as the Principal Research Fellow, where he remained till 2020, then becoming an Honorary Fellow. He also taught at the Rajaratnam School of International Studies (RSIS) at the Nanyang Technological University (NTU), and at the Lee Kuan Yew School of Public Policy in Singapore.

Chowdhury is on the Advisory Board of the New York-based Global Center on Cooperative Security. He has been attending the sessions of the Astana Club, a group of eminent global leaders annually hosted by the First President Nursultan Nazarbayev of Kazakhstan, and of the Beijing-based World Peace Forum.

In October 2020, he joined the private sector, when he assumed the post of Senior Group Advisor of Meinhardt International, a multidisciplinary engineering and designing multinational firm headquartered in Singapore. He is a member of the Association of Former BCS (FA) Ambassadors.

Personal life
Chowdhurys eldest brother Faruq Ahmed Choudhury was a foreign secretary, second brother Enam Ahmed Choudhury was secretary, and another brother is former ambassador Masum Ahmed Choudhury. A brother-in-law (freedom fighter Lieutenant colonel Syed Abdul Hai) was one of the highest -level Bangladeshi Army officers to have been killed during the Bangladesh Liberation War.
His youngest sister, Nina Ahmed, married Fakhruddin Ahmed, former chief adviser to the 2007-08 caretaker government.

References

1946 births
Living people
University of Dhaka alumni
Australian National University alumni
Permanent Representatives of Bangladesh to the United Nations
Ambassadors of Bangladesh to Qatar
Ambassadors of Bangladesh to the Holy See
Ambassadors of Bangladesh to Chile
Ambassadors of Bangladesh to Peru
Foreign ministers of Bangladesh
Advisors of Caretaker Government of Bangladesh
Notre Dame College, Dhaka alumni
St. Gregory's High School and College alumni